The Red Bull X-Alps is a paragliding race in which athletes must hike or fly 1,200 km across the Alps. It first launched in 2003 and has since taken place every other year. Around 30 athletes take part and must navigate their way via a predetermined set of turn points that vary with each race. Every kilometer must be covered either on foot or by paraglider. Teams consist of one athlete and one official supporter, whose role it is to provide technical advice, mental and nutritional support.

The route traditionally covers the Alpine regions of Austria, Germany, Italy, Switzerland and France before ending in Roquebrune-Cap-Martin, France. The 2017 route featured Slovenia as well.

Athletes didn't fly into Monaco due to airspace restrictions, and the term "Monaco" has been used solely for marketing purposes. That is one reason why in the tenth edition (2021) the route has been changed to not include Monaco but rather return to Austria.

The exact route is normally unveiled in the spring before the race start.

So far the race has only been won by Swiss nationals.

History
The concept for the Red Bull X-Alps was developed by Austrian pilot Hannes Arch who saw a TV documentary in which German pilot Toni Bender crossed the Alps from North to South by paraglider, carrying all his equipment, sleeping rough and hiking parts of the way.

"I thought it would be cool to base a paragliding competition on this format and developed a basic concept for it - and the idea was born! Together with Red Bull, we have developed it over the years to be the Red Bull X-Alps it is today - the toughest and most extreme endurance and outdoor race in the world. Its simplicity is what makes it most appealing. We start in Salzburg and whoever arrives in Monaco first wins. That's it. It's about body and soul, not about hundreds of rules and regulations," Arch has said.

When conditions are good, athletes use paragliders to fly, and when they are not they must run or hike, carrying their paraglider and other mandatory equipment. The use of tunnels and all other forms of transport are not permitted.

The first edition led from Austria's Dachstein Glacier to Monaco via Germany's highest mountain, the Zugspitze, Mont Blanc and Mont Gros in France. Seventeen athletes and their support teams covered a distance of 800 kilometers as the crow flies.

Over the years the route and the turn points have changed. From 2009 the race started off in the Austrian city of Salzburg. At 1,031 kilometers, the 2013 course was the longest in the history of the race and athletes had to pass 10 turn points: Gaisberg, Dachstein, and Wildkogel in Austria; Zugspitze in Germany; Ortler/Sulden in Italy; Interlaken, Matterhorn in Switzerland; Mont Blanc, Saint Hilaire, and Peille in France.

New to the 2015 race was the Powertraveller Prologue, a one-day hike and paragliding contest in the Salzburgerland region. Starting and finishing in Fuschl am See, athletes are required to hike or fly a 38 km course around two turn points, the Zwölferhorn and Schafberg peaks. It was won by Paul Guschlbauer in 2h 21m. In 2017, the prologue will return to Fuschl am See as the Leatherman Prologue on June 29.

The 2015 race started July 5 and ended July 17. It was won for the fourth time in a row by the Swiss athlete Christian Maurer who reached the finish, a landing float in Monaco bay, on July 14. His official time, which stops at the final turn point of Peille above Monaco, was 8d 4h 37m.

Thanks to GPS-Live Tracking, all athletes can be followed in real time on the official website throughout the race. The exact position of the athletes is monitored via data loggers and GSM cell phones. The athletes also carry a camera with them at all times. Stills and videos are used in the athletes’ online diaries, which are kept up to date by their supporters.

Rules
The first athlete to reach Monaco wins the race, which ends 48 hours later but not before a set finish time as defined by organizers. Thereafter, the race will officially end and athletes will be requested to stop racing. Pilots who have not reached the final destination within this time will be ranked according to the distance left to the final destination.

Since the 2011 edition, athletes are forced to have a mandatory rest between 23:00 and 04:00 and stay within a radius of 250m of their resting position for safety reasons. In 2013, the mandatory break was extended by 1.5 hours, from 22:30 to 05:00. If an athlete was still moving in that time, he would be subjected to a minimum penalty of 24 hours.  Athletes with penalty times had to prolong their next rest for the duration of their penalty time. Failure to comply with this rule led to disqualification.

New in 2013 was the so-called Night Pass, which allowed athletes to hike through the night. To use they had to inform organizers of their intention by 12:00 local time the day they wished to use. The idea behind the Night Pass was to allow athletes a chance to advance their position by tactical means once during the race. They may be able to hike to a key point where they can extend their lead or pass teams in front.

Since 2013, prototypes are banned from the competition and all equipment, including paragliders, harnesses, and helmets must comply with EN or LTF certifications.

X-Alps 2003

Route

The first course took the athletes from the Dachstein Glacier in Austria to Monaco. It was defined by two turn points, all of which had to be taken within a radius of 100 meters. Over the years the route and the turn points have changed.

Teams and results
Of the 17 competitors who started the race on July 14, 2003, on the Dachstein, only three made it to Monaco. All others completed between 30% and 90% of the course.

X-Alps 2005

Route

Dachstein Glacier, Austria, to Monaco.

Teams and results

17 athletes, two of which were women, competed in the second Red Bull X-Alps, starting on August 1, 2005. Four teams reached the final destination while three teams had to withdraw from the race due to injury. All others completed between 25% and 88% of the distance.

X-Alps 2007

Route

Dachstein Glacier, Austria, to Monaco.

Teams and results

30 teams started on July 23, 2007, for the third edition of the Red Bull X-Alps. 12 teams had to withdraw. Five teams made it to the final destination in Monaco.

Martin Müller was the fastest athlete, however, he was penalized with 36 hours due to an airspace violation in Sion, Switzerland. Müller was taken over by Alex Hofer and Toma Coconea at Mt Gros and only placed third. Winner Alex Hofer traveled 900 km (61% of the distance) in the air and walked 588 km (39%). In comparison, Coconea flew 24% of the distance and walked the other 76% (1,021 km).

X-Alps 2009

Route

For the first time the race started from the Mozartplatz in the center of the city of Salzburg, the end goal however remained the same. The number of turnpoints was increased to seven.

Teams and results

The fourth edition was the first one to start from a new starting point. On July 19, 2009, 30 teams started from the Mozartplatz in the Austrian city of Salzburg. Only two teams made it all the way to the final destination in Monaco while 12 teams had to withdraw, were disqualified or taken out of the race.

Chrigel Maurer was the fastest athlete and the first to reach Monaco from the air (he landed at Roquebrune Beach and ran to the last turnpoint on Mont Gros from where he flew to the final destination). Defending champion Alex Hofer arrived one day later. The winner traveled 72% (999 km) of the overall distance (1,379 km) in the air and walked the other 28% (380 km).

X-Alps 2011

Route

Mozartplatz, Salzburg, Austria, to Monaco.

Teams and results

As in 2009, the 2011 race started from the Mozartplatz in Salzburg. The 30 athletes who had been nominated by the race committee took off on July 17, 2011. Only two teams made it all the way to the final destination.

Defending champion Chrigel Maurer was the first to arrive in Monaco after 11 days, 4h and 52min after covering a total distance of 1,807 km, 1,321 km of which he covered by paraglider and 486 km on the ground.

X-Alps 2013

Route

Mozartplatz, Salzburg, Austria, to Monaco.

Teams and results

31 athletes took off from the Mozartplatz in Salzburg on July 7, 2013. A record number of ten teams made it all the way to Monaco.

At 1,031 km, the route was almost 200 km longer than in 2011. Chrigel Maurer was the first to arrive in Monaco, winning for the third time in a row. He made it in a record time of 6 days, 23h and 40min. He traveled a total distance of 2,556 km, 2,288 km of which he covered by paraglider and 268 km on the ground.

X-Alps 2015

Route

The route was announced on March 19, 2015. It follows an arc of Europe's highest mountains, starting in Salzburg, Austria and finishing in Monaco. The 2015 route has ten turnpoints and a straight-line distance of 1,038 km and is more challenging tactically than the 2013 race due to it having less obvious flight paths.

New to the 2015 edition was the Powertraveller Prologue, a one-day hike and paragliding race around the mountains of Fuschl am See. The first three athletes to finish the Prologue were each rewarded with a five-minute headstart in the Red Bull X-Alps race start on July 5 and an additional Led Lenser Nightpass to journey through the night, which is normally a mandatory rest period. First was Paul Guschlbauer (AUT1) 2h21m, second was Stanislav Mayer (CZE) in 2h22m, third was Gavin McClurg (USA2) 2h24m.

Teams and results

On December 29, 2014 the first 31 teams were revealed. Two more wildcard teams were added to the starters field on January 8, 2015. The race was won for the fourth time in a row by the Swiss athlete Christian Maurer in 8d 4h 37m, flying an Advance Omega paraglider.

X-Alps 2017

Route
The route was announced on March 29, 2017. With seven turnpoints and a straight-line distance of 1,138 km, it was the longest route so far.

In 2017, the Prologue returned as the Leatherman Prologue race on June 29. The one-day hiking race which saw no paragliding due to bad weather took place around the mountains of Fuschl am See. The athletes started in Fuschl and reached the Zwölferhorn before returning to Fuschl as fast as possible. The first three athletes to finish the Prologue race were rewarded with a head start on day two of the main race and an additional Ledlenser Nightpass to journey through the night, which is normally a mandatory rest period.

Teams and results
The competing athletes were announced on November 2, 2016 via social media. Two more wildcard teams were added to the field on January 2, 2017. In 2017, 31 teams took part in Red Bull X-Alps; 12 rookies, as well as reigning champion Chrigel Maurer and legend Toma Coconea, who has taken part in every edition so far.

X-Alps 2019

Route
The 2019 route started in Salzburg, Austria and ended in Monaco.

Teams and results
A total of 32 athletes started the 2019 race.

X-Alps 2021
The 10th edition of the race started on 20 June 2021, at 11:30 AM from the Mozartplatz in the center of the city of Salzburg.

Route
The 2021 route will start in Salzburg, Austria and end in Zell am See.

Teams 
A total of 29 athletes competed in the 2021 race.

Results

X-Alps 2023 
The 11th edition of the race will start on 11 June 2023.

Route
The 2023 route will start in Kitzbühel, Austria and end in Zell am See.

Teams 
(IN PROCESS) A total of 34 athletes competed in the 2023 race.

Winners

References

External links 
 Red Bull X-Alps

Adventure racing
Paragliding
X-Alps
Multisports in Switzerland